The monarchs of Brazil (Portuguese: monarcas do Brasil) were the imperial heads of state and hereditary rulers of Brazil from the House of Braganza that reigned from the creation of the Brazilian monarchy in 1815 as a constituent kingdom of the United Kingdom of Portugal, Brazil and the Algarves until the republican coup d'état that overthrew the Empire of Brazil in 1889.

The coast of the territory which would become known as Brazil was first explored by Portuguese navigators on 22 April 1500. This territory was subsequently colonized by the Portuguese crown. Since the transfer of the Portuguese court to Brazil in 1808, colonial rule had de facto ended. On 16 December 1815, Prince Regent John, the future king John VI, raised Brazil to the status of a kingdom, thus making his mother, Maria I, the reigning queen, the first monarch of Brazil. The next year, 20 March 1816, John succeeded his mother as king of the united Luso-Brazilian monarchy. Having proclaimed independence of the Kingdom of Brazil from Portugal in 1822, Pedro I, son of John VI, was acclaimed the first emperor of Brazil on 12 October 1822. He was later succeeded on 7 April 1831 by his son Pedro II, deposed along with the 74-years-old monarchy on 15 November 1889 in a bloodless and unpopular military coup d'état.

Title
From 16 December 1815 to 7 September 1822, while the Kingdom of Brazil was in union with the Kingdom of Portugal, the monarch's full title and styles were, according to tradition and the United Kingdom's 1822 Constitution: By the Grace of God, King/Queen of the United Kingdom of Portugal, Brazil, and the Algarves, of either side of the sea in Africa, Lord of Guinea and of Conquest, Navigation and Commerce of Ethiopia, Arabia, Persia and India, etc.

From 12 October 1822 to 15 November 1889, as the independent Empire of Brazil, the country's monarch's full title were: By Grace of God and Unanimous Acclamation of the People, Constitutional Emperor/Empress and Perpetual Defender of Brazil.

It's worth noting that from a short period of time, between 15 November 1825 and 10 March 1826, according to the Treaty of Rio de Janeiro, by which Portugal recognized Brazilian independence, it was granted to King John VI the courtesy title of Emperor of Brazil, while his son was the actual reigning emperor. From the treaty's date to his death John VI used the title: By the Grace of God, John VI, Emperor of Brazil, King of Portugal and the Algarves, of either side of the sea in Africa, Lord of Guinea and of Conquest, Navigation and Commerce of Ethiopia, Arabia, Persia and India, etc.

Colonial Brazil (1500–1815)
House of Avis

Brazil is discovered by Portuguese navigators on April 22, 1500, and becomes a Portuguese colony.

House of Habsburg

The House of Habsburg, known as the Philippine Dynasty, is the house that ruled Portugal from 1581 to 1640. The dynasty began with the acclamation of Philip II of Spain as Philip I of Portugal in 1580, officially recognized in 1581 by the Portuguese Cortes of Tomar. Philip I swore to rule Portugal as a kingdom separate from his Spanish domains, under the personal union known as the Iberian Union.

House of Braganza

The House of Braganza, also known as the Brigantine Dynasty, came to power in 1640, when John II, Duke of Braganza, claimed to be the rightful heir of the defunct House of Aviz, as he was the great great grandson of King Manuel I. John was proclaimed King John IV, and he deposed the House of Habsburg in the Portuguese Restoration War.

Kingdom of Brazil (1815–1822)

The house of Braganza continued to rule over Brazil, and on 16 December 1815, the Prince Regent John, the future king John VI raised Brazil to the status of a kingdom, thus making his mother, Maria I, the reigning Queen, the first Monarch of Brazil. The next year, 20 March 1816, John succeeded his mother as King of the united Luso-Brazilian monarchy.

Empire of Brazil (1822–1889)

The house of Braganza continued to rule over Brazil after Pedro I, son of John VI, was acclaimed the first Emperor of Brazil on 12 October 1822, having proclaimed the independence of the Kingdom of Brazil from Portugal. He was later succeeded on 7 April 1831 by his son Pedro II, the last monarch of Brazil. Pedro II of Brazil, reigned 49 years in fact or 58 years if the regency period is considered.

See also
 History of Brazil
 History of Portugal
 List of governors-general of Brazil (including the viceroys)
 List of Brazilian consorts
 List of presidents of Brazil
 List of Portuguese monarchs

References

External links
 Monarchs of Brazil (1815–1889)

Brazil
Monarchs
Monarchs
Brazilian nobility
Brazilian monarchs